Dolores Donlon (born Patricia Vaniver; September 19, 1920 – November 30, 2012) was an American model and actress.

Career
Born in 1920 in Philadelphia and raised in Upper Darby, Pennsylvania, Donlon attended a convent school in Tarrytown, New York. She later trimmed a few years off her age by claiming 1926 was her year of birth when she began modeling in the mid-1940s under the name Pat Van Iver. for the Walter Thornton Model Agency. She began acting in 1948 with uncredited walk-on parts in movies including Dough Girls and Easter Parade.

In 1946, she was elected Queen of the Ball by the New York Press Photographers Association.  By 1954, she was playing credited roles in movies such as The Long Wait and Security Risk, and appearing in television series. Her television credits include roles in Have Gun - Will Travel, The Texan, Richard Diamond, Private Detective, Maverick, Perry Mason, The Jack Benny Program, 77 Sunset Strip and I Love Lucy.

In 1957, Donlon was Playboy's August Playmate of the Month.

Marriages
Donlon was married to Hollywood talent agent Victor Orsatti from 1949 to 1960. The couple separated in 1958 after nine years of marriage, and were divorced in 1960. She starred in Italian director Franco Rossi's 1961 film, Nude Odyssey. She retired from acting the following year after marrying New York Philharmonic violinist Robert dePasquale. She later divorced dePasquale and married Fernando Mendez. That union also ended in divorce. All three marriages were childless.

Death
Donlon died in her native Philadelphia, Pennsylvania on November 30, 2012, aged 92.

References

External links

 
 

1950s Playboy Playmates
1920 births
2012 deaths
Actresses from Philadelphia
21st-century American women